Rauchen und Yoga is an album by German band Japanische Kampfhörspiele.

Track listing

Personnel
 Christof Kather – drums, vocals
 Klaus Nicodem – guitar
 Robert Nowak – guitar
 Marco Bachmann – bass
 Markus "Bony" Hoff – vocals
 Martin Freund – vocals
 René Hauffe – guitar

References
Encyclopaedia Metallum
Official Site Discography

2007 albums
Japanische Kampfhörspiele albums